Palmulacypraea is a genus of sea snails, marine gastropod molluscs in the family Cypraeidae, the cowries

Species
Species within the genus Austrasiatica include:
Palmulacypraea boucheti (Lorenz, 2002)
Palmulacypraea katsuae (Kuroda, 1960)
Palmulacypraea musumea (Kuroda and Habe, 1961)
Palmulacypraea omii (Ikeda, 1998)

References

 Meyer C. 2003. Molecular systematics of cowries (Gastropoda: Cypraeidae) and diversification patterns in the tropics. Biological Journal of the Linnean Society, 79: 401-459. page(s): 458

Cypraeidae
Gastropod genera